The 1935 Kansas Jayhawks football team represented the University of Kansas in the Big Six Conference during the 1935 college football season. In their fourth season under head coach Adrian Lindsey, the Jayhawks compiled a 4–4–1 record (2–2–1 against conference opponents), finished in third place in the conference, and were outscored by opponents by a combined total of 118 to 102. They played their home games at Memorial Stadium in Lawrence, Kansas. John Peterson was the team captain.

Schedule

References

Kansas
Kansas Jayhawks football seasons
Kansas Jayhawks football